Neophasmophaga is a genus of parasitic flies in the family Tachinidae.

Species
Neophasmophaga teixeirai Guimarães, 1982

Distribution
Brazil.

References

Exoristinae
Tachinidae genera
Monotypic Brachycera genera
Diptera of South America